Lando Platform railway station served the town of Kidwelly, Carmarthenshire, Wales, from 1915 to 1964 on the South Wales Railway.

History 
The station was opened as Lando Siding on 15 September 1915 by the Great Western Railway, although the agreements for the services were made on 19 September and the first Trains ran on 20 September of the same year. It didn't appear in the timetable as it only served workmen. Its name was changed to Lando Halt later but it was changed again to Lando Platform in September 1928. This name was added to the Railway Clearing House handbook in January 1948. It closed on 15 June 1964.

References 

Disused railway stations in Carmarthenshire
Former Great Western Railway stations
Beeching closures in Wales
Railway stations in Great Britain opened in 1915
Railway stations in Great Britain closed in 1964
1915 establishments in Wales
1964 disestablishments in Wales